Epinette can refer to:
 Chardonnay, a wine grape that is also known as Epinette
 Saint-Pierre Doré, another wine grape that is also known as Epinette
 Epinette des Vosges, a diatonic fretted zither from the Vosges region of France
 Spinet, small keyboard instrument
 Épinettes, a district in the 17th arrondissement of Paris